You Bet! is a British game show that aired on ITV between 20 February 1988 and 12 April 1997, initially hosted by Bruce Forsyth from 1988 to 1990, then by Matthew Kelly from 1991 to 1995 and finally by Darren Day from 1996 to 1997.

Format
A panel of celebrities would bet on the ability of members of the public to achieve unlikely challenges and stunts, which they had usually planned and rehearsed many times, within a limited amount of time. The studio audience would also place a bet on the outcomes. The panellists would receive points for each outcome they predicted correctly, based on the percentage of the studio audience that also placed a correct bet. The celebrity sponsoring the challenge always had to bet that their challenger would be successful. The accumulated total of points achieved by the celebrities would be added to the points totalled by the studio audience, increased several times over, converted into pounds and donated to a charity chosen by the celebrity panellist who had achieved the highest score.

Timeline

1988
Each week there would be four challenges, some in the studio and some on location presented by Ellis Ward. The panellists would each "sponsor" a challenge, and Bruce Forsyth would also sponsor one. If the challenge sponsored by the panellist or Bruce Forsyth was not achieved, that sponsor would have to do a forfeit. (e.g., being a golf caddie or air steward for the day). (In the case of Forsyth's challenge, the majority vote determined Forsyth's prediction; an incorrect prediction forced Forsyth to do his forfeit. His explanation for this part was usually, "You're now betting for the fate of Forsyth in the form of a forfeit. If you're right, I'm alright; but if you're wrong, I'm right in it!") It was either broadcast in the studio on the same show or broadcast on location on the following week's show. The show dropped the talk show aspects of Wetten, dass...? and concentrated on the challenges, thus reducing the running time from 2 to 3 hours to 1 hour. The original theme tune was composed by Alan Lisk, better known for penning the theme tune to Men Behaving Badly. The show's airing slot was originally on Saturday nights.

The show closed with Forsyth doing a rap, along with the audience shouting back every "You Bet!" line: "Do you wanna bet on it? You bet! Well you'd betta get on it? You bet! So don't fret, get set are you ready? You Bet! Goodnight, God bless, I'll see you next week, bye!"

1989–1990
A new theme tune composed by Jonathan Sorrell was introduced in the show's second series.

Spring 1991
Series 4 saw some massive changes following the departure of Forsyth at the end of series 3. A new logo was introduced and Matthew Kelly took over as host. Also, the challenges increased from four to five, which meant that Ward got involved, with her sponsoring challenges as well.  Another change from the Forsyth era was that the celebrity guests could no longer specify the nature of their forfeit should their challenge fail – instead, they had to choose from a list of pre-defined forfeits hidden under cryptic statements – for instance "Dinner Coming Up" meant that the forfeit was to try and eat whilst riding a roller-coaster. Kelly also got involved in doing the work on location challenges, as well as Ward. Finally, if Kelly's challenge ended in failure, he had to do his forfeit, regardless of the audience's prediction.

Autumn 1991
Series 5's airing slot was moved from Saturday nights to Friday nights and a reworked version of the theme tune was introduced.

1992–1993
The departure of Ward as co-host led to the number of celebrity guests being increased from three to four per show and Kelly doing all the work on location challenges.

1994
The show's airing slot was moved back to Saturday nights and the remaining episodes of the seventh series were sponsored by Daily Mirror.

1995
For You Bet's eighth series, it was decided there would be no more forfeits for both the celebrities and host Matthew Kelly when sponsoring their challenges until the forfeits were reinstated in for series 9 in 1996 after Darren Day had taken over from Matthew Kelly as host. Instead, they introduced the celebrity challenge, where the lowest celebrity scorer would do only one forfeit challenge, which would be broadcast in the following week's show. The public then got to vote in at home to donate £1,000 to a charity of their choice if the celebrity succeeded or failed the challenge. The set was replaced by a new "arena" that allowed much more floor space for the challenges. It was while series 8 was on screen Matthew Kelly had announced his intention to leave the show after 4 years to concentrate hosting Stars in Their Eyes. The viewers' phone vote for the Celebrity Challenge was dropped after Series 8 was shown.

1996
For series 9, actor Darren Day took over as host from Kelly who had left the show to concentrate hosting Stars in Their Eyes. The role of co-host that had been absent during series 6–8 following the departure of Ward at the end of series 5 was reinstated for all the work in the location challenges. For this penultimate series, Diane Youdale, who was better known as Jet from the UK series of Gladiators, would take over as the new co-host. The forfeits, having been absent from the earlier series also returned to the show, but they were not chosen by the celebrity guests. They were automatically chosen by the crew at the end of each show for the celebrity who had lowest score in the show.

1997
The show introduced a new item for the celebrities, they could play their YOU BET! BONUS CARD, which meant their points would be doubled if they successfully guessed the outcome of a challenge (which can only be played once in the entire show). The celebrity challenge returned to the show, and the audience got to choose which challenge they would choose for the lowest scoring celebrity at the end of the show from two choices with cryptic clue titles (e.g., "Ooh! That's better!" or "Dangling Down"). Sarah Matravers, well known as a gong girl from Take Your Pick, replaced Youdale as co-host for this final series. A new theme tune was introduced, composed by Simon Webb.

Episodes
The coloured backgrounds denote the result of each of the shows:

 – indicates the celebrity successfully backed their challenge and avoided their forfeit (Series 1–7).
 – indicates the celebrity failed to back their challenge and received their forfeit (Series 1–7).
BOLD - indicates the celebrity scored the most points and received money for their chosen charity.ITALIC'' - indicates the celebrity scored the fewest points and received a celebrity challenge/forfeit (Series 8–10).

Series 1 (1988)

Series 2 (1989)

Series 3 (1990)

Series 4 (Spring 1991)

Series 5 (Autumn 1991)

Series 6 (1992)

Audience member Susan Elvy was asked to play the part of Meryl Streep throughout the show

Christmas Special (1992)

Series 7 (1993–1994)

Celebrity Special (1994)

Series 8 (1995)

Series 9 (1996)

Series 10 (1997)

Transmissions

Series

Specials

References

External links

You Bet! at BFI

1988 British television series debuts
1997 British television series endings
1980s British game shows
1990s British game shows
English-language television shows
ITV game shows
London Weekend Television shows
Television series by ITV Studios
Wagering
British television series based on non-British television series